The following is a list of mayors of the city of Lviv, Ukraine. It includes positions equivalent to mayor, such as chairperson of the city council executive committee.

Mayors

Most prominent mayors (burmistrz) during the Polish–Lithuanian Commonwealth 
 Peter Stecher (1407)
 Paweł Kampian (1584)
 Stanisław Dybowicki (1594, 1601)
 Stanisław Scholz (1598)
 Georg Boim (between 1610 and 1614)
 Bartołomiej Uberowicz (1619)
 Marcin Kampian (1623)
 Erasmus Sixt (1627)
 Jan Alnpeck (1630)
 Józef Bartłomiej Zimorowic (1648, 1664-1672)
 Marcin Groswaier (1641, 1643, 1645, 1650)
 Dominik Wilczek (1686, 1688, 1692, 1694, 1701, 1704)
 Vasyl Illiashevych (1763, 1765, 1766, 1769)
 Józef Jaśkiewicz (1786)
  (1786)

Habsburg monarchy - Austrian Partition 

 Marcin Mercenier 
 
  (1787-1816)
 Jan Hoffman (1817–1825)
 Jan Homme (1825–1841)
 Emil Gerard Festenburg (1842–1848)
  1848
 Karol Höpflingen-Bergendorf (1848–1858)
  (1859–1869)
  (1869–1871)
  (1871–1873)
  (1873–1880)
  (1880–1883)
  (1883–1887)
  (1887–1896)
 Godzimir Małachowski (1896–1905)
  (1905–1907)
  (1907–1911)
  (1911–1914)
  (1914–1915, 1918)

Second Polish Republic 

  (1919) 
  (1919–1927)
 Jan Strzelecki (1927–1928)
  
  (1930–1931)
  (1931–1936)
 Stanisław Ostrowski (1936–1939)

Vice Presidents
  (1931–1935) 
  (1932-)
 
 
 
 
 Michał Kolbuszowski

World War II 
Soviet occupation
 Fyodor Jeremenko (1939–1941)

German occupation
 Jurij Pol'anśkyj (1941) 
 Hans von Kujath (1941–1942)
 Egon Höller (1942–1944)

Ukrainian SSR 
After Lviv was incorporated into the USSR, the position of the president of Lviv, elected by the City Council, was abolished. The city was ruled by the chairman of the Presidium of the Lviv City Council (Голови міськвиконкому).

 Pavel Boyko (1944–1945) 
 Petro Taran (1945–1948)
 Vasyl Nikolaenko (1948–1951)
 Kostiatyn Boyko (1951–1956)
 Petro Owsianko (1956–1958)
 Spirydon Bondarchuk (1958–1959)
 Vasyl Nikolaenko (1959–1961)
 Roman Zawerbnyj (1961–1963)
 Apołłon Jagodzinski (1963–1971)
 Roman Musiejewski (1971–1975)
 Wjaczesław Sekretariuk (1975–1980)
 Volodymyr Pechota (1980–1988)
 Bohdan Kotyk (1988–1991)

Ukraine 
After the establishment of independent Ukraine, until 1998 the modified system of the Soviet Union was preserved (chairman of the presidium of the City Council, combined with the function of the chairman of the council). Since 1998, the mayor of Lviv, elected in direct democratic elections, is also the chairman of the executive committee of the City Council (the so-called miskwykonkomu) and the chairman of the Lviv City Council.

 Vasyl Shpitser (1991–1994) 
 Vasyl Kuybida (1994–2002) (from 1998 the mayor of Lviv elected in direct elections)
 Lubomyr Buniak (2002-2005)
 Zinowij Siryk (2005-2006)
 Andriy Sadovyi (from 2006)

See also
 Timeline of Lviv

References

This article incorporates information from the Polish Wikipedia.

External links

History of Lviv
Lviv